Edgar Collins Bogardus (26 July 1927 – 11 May 1958) was an American poet. His work appeared in Kenyon Review, Shenandoah, Virginia Quarterly Review, Yale Literary Magazine.

Biography
He was born on 26 July 1927 in Mount Vernon, Ohio. He graduated from Yale University with a B.A. and an M.A.  He taught at Carnegie Institute of Technology, the University of Connecticut, and Kenyon College. He was managing editor of the Kenyon Review. He died on  11 May 1958 in Mount Vernon, Ohio.

Awards
 1953 Guggenheim Fellowship

Works
 
 Last poems, The Kenyon review, 1960

Anthologies

References

1927 births
1958 deaths
Yale University alumni
Carnegie Mellon University faculty
University of Connecticut faculty
Kenyon College faculty
Yale Younger Poets winners
20th-century American poets